KJAC is a non-commercial public radio station located in Timnath, Colorado, broadcasting to the Fort Collins-Denver, Colorado area on 105.5 FM.

History

Adult hits (2004-2012) 
The station previously aired an adult hits music format branded as "Jack FM".

Jack FM Denver was the first Jack radio station in the United States. Denver's Jack employed a comedic irreverence in its presentation, and a style of music endemic to the varied tastes of Colorado's front-range listeners. Each Jack station is a little different, and KJAC's attention to the style of Colorado gave the station a unique and local feel.

On September 1, 2008, NRC Broadcasting converted KCUV, into a rebroadcast of the current Jack FM feed, utilizing the 102.3 FM frequency to serve the broader Denver metropolitan area, while retaining the current 105.5 FM frequency that serves Northern Colorado. Jingles broadcast over the air often interchanged 102.3 FM and 105.5 FM, depending on whether the focus was on Denver, or the station in general.

On July 15, 2010, it was announced that KJAC would stick with the current format while sister station KDSP flipped to sports on July 19, 2010.

In 2011, 105.5 Jack FM dropped the local version and started using the Dial Global StorQ version that smaller market Jacks use.

Sports (2012-2016)
On September 7, 2012, KJAC started stunting with classic country as "Bob FM", which led to a flip to ESPN Radio.

Adult alternative (2016-present) 
On December 7, 2015, Front Range Sports Networks sold KJAC to Community Radio for Northern Colorado, who converted the station to a non-commercial Adult Album Alternative format on February 29, 2016, allowing primary station KUNC/Fort Collins, Colorado to focus on News/Talk programming. After KJAC ended its programming on January 3, 2016, ESPN Radio returned to former Denver affiliate KEPN in a full-time status with sister KKFN adding overnight programming (and dropping Fox Sports Radio from the schedule) starting January 4.

On February 29, 2016, the adult album alternative format was officially launched as "The Colorado Sound". The sale to Community Radio for Northern Colorado was consummated on April 5, 2016, at a price of $3 million.

On July 14, 2017, KJAC began simulcasting on translator K232AC 94.3 FM Breckenridge.

References

External links

 
 

Shakeup in Denver sports talk radio, FM dial has new station

JAC
Adult album alternative radio stations in the United States
Community radio stations in the United States
Larimer County, Colorado
Radio stations established in 1990
1990 establishments in Colorado
NPR member stations